42 Librae is a single star located around 370 light years distant from the Sun in the southern zodiac constellation of Libra. It is visible to the naked eye as a faint, orange-hued star with an apparent visual magnitude of 4.97. This object is drifting closer to the Earth with a heliocentric radial velocity of −22 km/s.

This is an aging giant star with a stellar classification of K3-III CN2, where the suffix notation indicates this is a strong CN star with a high overabundance of cyanogen in its spectrum. Having exhausted the supply of hydrogen at its core, this star has expanded to 26 times the Sun's radius. Within the margin of error it has near-solar abundances of iron,  suggesting a Sun–like metallicity. The star is radiating 214 times the luminosity of the Sun from its swollen photosphere at an effective temperature of 4,332 K.

References

K-type giants
CN stars
Libra (constellation)
Durchmusterung objects
Librae, 42
Gliese and GJ objects
139663
076742
5824